Lichen is a type of symbiotic organism.

Lichen may also refer to:

Arts, entertainment, and media
 Lichens (musician), Robert Lowe's solo musical project
 "Lichen", the nickname for an untitled song by Aphex Twin from the album Selected Ambient Works Volume II

Biology
 Asphodelus albus,  a herbaceous perennial plant sometimes called white lichen
 Lichen planus, an inflammatory disease
 Lichen sclerosus, a skin disease
 Lichen simplex chronicus, a skin disease

Places
Licheń Stary, a village in central Poland
Sanctuary of Our Lady of Licheń, a large church at Licheń Stary
Licheń, Lubusz Voivodeship, a village in western Poland

See also
 Li Chen (disambiguation)
 Lich, an undead creature
 Lichen Lake (disambiguation)
 Lycan (disambiguation)